Bacchisa nigriventris is a species of beetle in the family Cerambycidae. It was described by Thomson in 1865. It is known from Borneo and Malaysia.

References

N
Beetles described in 1865